Frank Charles Kristufek (December 12, 1915 – June 16, 1998) was an American football player. 

A native of McKees Rock, Pennsylvania, he attended Mckeesport High School and played college football for Pittsburgh. He was also a heavyweight wrestling champion while in college. He then played professional football in the National Football League (NFL) for the Brooklyn Dodgers in 1940 and 1941. He appeared in 22 NFL games as a tackle. 

He lived for the final 50 years of his life in Torrance, California. He died there in 1998 at age 82.

References

1915 births
1998 deaths
Brooklyn Dodgers (NFL) players
Pittsburgh Panthers football players
Players of American football from Pennsylvania
American football tackles
People from McKees Rocks, Pennsylvania